The Swiss Numismatic Society (SNS ; Schweizerische Numismatische Rundschau in German) was founded in 1879 and is a registered non-profit organization. It is the overall Swiss association of individuals and institutions with an interest in ancient and modern numismatics.

SNS is a learned society and promotes research into all branches of numismatics. Foremost researchers and collectors, both professional and amateur, in the field of numismatics are amongst the members of the Society.

Journals
The SNS publishes two journals, the annual Swiss Numismatic Review and the quarterly Swiss Numismatic Gazette, with scholarly articles in four languages (English/German/French/Italian).

Monographic series
The SNS also published:
 E. Tobler, B. Zäch, S. Nussbaum, "Die Münzprägung der Stadt St. Gallen 1407 bis 1797", 2008.
 S. Hurter, "Die Didrachmenprägung von Segesta", 2008.
 G.K. Jenkins, "Coins of Punic Sicily", 1997.
 M. Price, "The Coinage in the Name of Alexander the Great and Philip Arrhidaeus", 1991.
 L. Mildenberg, "The Coinage of the Bar Kokhba War", 1984.
 B. Deppert-Lippitz, "Untersuchungen zur Münzprägung Milets vom vierten bis ersten Jahrhundert v.Chr.", 1984.
 B. Schulte, "Die Goldprägung der gallischen Kaiser von Postumus bis Tetricus", 1983.
 A. Furtwängler, "Monnaies grecques en Gaule: Le trésor d'Auriol et le monnayage de Massalia, 535/520-450 av. J.-C.", 1978.
 P. Felder, "Medailleur Johann Carl Hedlinger (1691–1771)", 1978.
 B. Simonetta, "The Coins of the Cappadocian Kings", 1977.
 L. Weidauer, "Probleme der frühen Elektronprägung", 1975.
 H.-U. Geiger, "Der Beginn der Gold- und Dickmünzenprägung in Bern", 1968.

External links

Official website

Organizations established in 1879